Yukhon (also Meunsai) was the fifth king of the Lao kingdom of Lan Xang. He was the younger brother of Phommathat, and possibly a minor. He ruled 8 months but Nang Keo Phimpha (the de facto ruler of the kingdom) soon became dissatisfied with his performance as king and planned to have him executed. He fled but was assassinated at Phadao on orders from Nang Keo Phimpha.

References

Kings of Lan Xang
Year of birth unknown
1430 deaths
15th-century Laotian people
15th-century monarchs in Asia
Laotian Theravada Buddhists
Suicides in Asia